The Gashatan is an Asian Land Mammal Age, a large biozone which corresponds to ages between 58.7–55.8 Ma for finds of fossil mammals in Asia. This zone lies within the Thanetian stage of the Paleocene series. It precedes the Bumbanian.

Paleocene